Jiří Jelínek (born May 24, 1979) is a Czech professional ice hockey defenceman. He played with HC Kladno in the Czech Extraliga during the 2010–11 Czech Extraliga season.

References

External links

1979 births
Czech ice hockey defencemen
Rytíři Kladno players
Living people
Sportspeople from Kladno
Beibarys Atyrau players
MsHK Žilina players
MHK Kežmarok players
HK Poprad players
BK Mladá Boleslav players
HC Berounští Medvědi players
BK Havlíčkův Brod players
Czech expatriate ice hockey players in Germany
Czech expatriate ice hockey players in Slovakia
Czech expatriate sportspeople in Kazakhstan
Expatriate ice hockey players in Kazakhstan